Christ Church is a grade-II listed church in the suburban village of Blakenall Heath, in the Metropolitan Borough of Walsall, in the county of the West Midlands, England. The church is located off Blakenall Heath near the village centre. It is one of the prominent landmarks in the area and can be seen from surrounding areas to Blakenall Heath. The church consists of a church tower and the main prayer hall. There is also a nursery near the church and a primary school.

References

Christ Church, Blakenall Heath
Buildings and structures in Walsall